Impulse is a steel roller coaster located at Knoebels Amusement Resort in Elysburg, Pennsylvania. It is manufactured by Zierer and is the first major steel coaster located at Knoebels since Whirlwind which closed in 2004. Impulse was the park's priciest addition when completed in 2015.

History

The park had been looking for a new roller coaster after Whirlwind (now Bocaraca) was closed and shipped to Parque de Diversiones in Costa Rica in 2004. The park hired German manufacturer Zierer Rides to design the new ride. The actual design process did not start until 2009, due to the financial crisis of 2007–2008. Construction of the parts began in July 2013 and was assembled at the park in late February 2015; the project was complete by April 2015.

Impulse replaced the Bumper Boats ride, which was purchased from Rocky Glen Park in Moosic, Pennsylvania in the 1980s.

Ride experience
Riders are restrained by a lap bar only which comes across the legs and the waist. The ride features small, 8 passenger trains, resulting in a low capacity.

The ride starts off by rounding a bend and then climbing the 98 ft (30m) lift hill. The train then proceeds to go straight down and into the first inversion, a cobra roll. The train then goes into a vertical loop followed by a series of twists and turns around the vertical lift hill until it enters the final inversion, a zero g roll. The train then goes into a short, but intense, helix before the brake run and into the station. The complete ride is one minute and twenty seconds.

Riders can also purchase a photograph of themselves on the roller coaster after the ride is through.

Elements

Vertical Lift Hill
Cobra Roll
Loop
Inline Twist
540° Helix

References

Roller coasters in Pennsylvania